Charles Huntziger (25 June 1880 – 11 November 1941) was a French Army general during World War I and World War II.
He was born at Lesneven (Finistère), in Brittany of a family which settled in the region, after the Prussian invasion of Alsace during the 1870 Franco-Prussian War. He graduated from Saint-Cyr in 1900 and joined the colonial infantry. During World War I, he served in the Middle Eastern theatre. He was chief of staff of operations of the Allied Expeditionary Force. In 1918, he participated in the development of General Louis Franchet d'Espèrey's Vardar Offensive against German and Bulgarian forces which would lead to Allied victory and the signing of the Armistice of Mudros in October 1918.

In 1924, during the interwar period, he was assigned to the French concession in Tianjin.

In 1933, Huntziger was named commander-in-chief of the troops in the French Mandate of Syria. He participated in the negotiations for the cession of the Sanjak of Alexandretta, then part of French Syria, to Turkey. He joined the Superior Council of War in 1938.

At the outbreak of World War II, he initially commanded the Second French Army, then the Fourth Army Group in the Ardennes. He fought in the Battle of France with the Second Army. On 16 June 1940, Premier Philippe Pétain's new Cabinet decided upon an armistice.  The armistice negotiations were led, on the French side, by Huntziger, who without success attempted to lessen the harsh terms of the armistice.

After the 25 June armistice, Huntziger became the Vichy government's commander-in-chief of land forces. He became Minister of Defence on 6 September 1940, serving until 11 August 1941. He was one of the signatories of the anti-Semitic law on the status of Jews of 3 October 1940 (excluding nine Jewish generals from the army) together with Philippe Pétain, Pierre Laval, Raphaël Alibert, Marcel Peyrouton, Paul Baudouin, Yves Bouthillier, and François Darlan.

He died on 11 November 1941, when his aircraft crashed near Le Vigan, Gard. He had been on an inspection tour in North Africa and tried to land at Vichy Airport in bad visibility, and with obsolete radio equipment. His funeral was on 15 November 1941 at the cathedral of Vichy. Huntziger is buried in Passy Cemetery, Paris.

His widow was the first recipient of the Vichy regime's Order of the Francisque.

See also
 Paris Protocols

Notes

External links 

Generals of World War II

1880 births
1941 deaths
Burials at Passy Cemetery
People from Finistère
People of Vichy France
École Spéciale Militaire de Saint-Cyr alumni
Victims of aviation accidents or incidents in France
Secretaries of State for War (France)
French Army generals of World War II
French military personnel of World War I
Generalissimos
Jewish French history
Members of the Académie Française
Lycée Louis-le-Grand alumni
High Commissioners of the Levant
Order of the Francisque recipients
Grand Croix of the Légion d'honneur
Commanders of the Order of the Crown (Belgium)
Recipients of the Order of Lāčplēsis, 2nd class
Recipients of the Virtuti Militari
Recipients of the Croix de Guerre 1939–1945 (France)
Recipients of the Croix de guerre des théâtres d'opérations extérieures
Recipients of the Croix de guerre (Belgium)
Recipients of the Distinguished Service Medal (US Army)
Honorary Companions of the Order of the Bath
Honorary Knights Commander of the Order of St Michael and St George
French anti-communists
French collaborators with Nazi Germany
French Ministers of War and National Defence
20th-century French military personnel
Foreign recipients of the Distinguished Service Medal (United States)